Ectenessa is a genus of beetles in the family Cerambycidae, containing the following species:

 Ectenessa affinis Martins, Galileo & Oliveira, 2011
 Ectenessa andrei Martins & Galileo, 1996
 Ectenessa angusticollis (Buquet, 1860)
 Ectenessa argodi Belon, 1902
 Ectenessa decorata (Melzer, 1935)
 Ectenessa fenestrata (Gounelle, 1909)
 Ectenessa guttigera (Lucas, 1857)
 Ectenessa lurida Martins, 1973
 Ectenessa melanicornis Napp & Martins, 1982
 Ectenessa nitida Bates, 1885
 Ectenessa ocellata (Gounelle, 1909)
 Ectenessa ornatipennis Tippmann, 1960
 Ectenessa quadriguttata (Burmeister, 1865)
 Ectenessa scansor (Gounelle, 1909)
 Ectenessa spinipennis (Buquet, 1860)
 Ectenessa villardi Belon, 1902
 Ectenessa zamalloae Galileo & Martins, 2008

References

Ectenessini